The second USS Glide was a sternwheel tinclad gunboat in the United States Navy during the American Civil War.

Originally built in Murraysville, Virginia in 1863, was purchased by the Navy the same year. She was converted to a "tinclad" gunboat No. 43 USS Glide. From early 1864 until the end of the war she was assigned to blockading duties in Berwick Bay, Louisiana. She was decommissioned and sold in August 1865, then she served in commercial service as Glide. She was destroyed by a boiler explosion in January 1869.

References

Ships of the Union Navy
Ships built in Virginia
Gunboats of the United States Navy
American Civil War patrol vessels of the United States
Steamships of the United States Navy
1863 ships
Maritime incidents in January 1869
Ships sunk by non-combat internal explosions
Shipwrecks